Teemu Turunen (born 24 November 1995) is a Finnish professional ice hockey player currently under contract with Oulun Kärpät of the Finnish Liiga and the Finnish national team.

On 5 May 2021, Turunen left HC Davos of the National League and signed as a free agent to a one-year deal with Finnish-based, Jokerit of the KHL.

He represented Finland at the 2021 IIHF World Championship.

References

External links

1995 births
Living people
Finnish expatriate ice hockey players in Switzerland
Finnish ice hockey left wingers
Finnish ice hockey right wingers
HC Davos players
HPK players
Jokerit players
Mikkelin Jukurit players
Ice hockey people from Helsinki